Lake Drwęca (Polish: Jezioro Drwęckie, German: Drewenzer See) is a lake in the Masurian Lake District of the Warmian-Masurian Voivodeship of Poland. The Drwęca river flows through it.

Drweca
Drweca